Mullakayevo (Mullaqay) is a rural locality (a village) in Kulchurovsky Selsoviet, Baymaksky District, Bashkortostan, Russia. The population was 475 as of 2010. There are 4 streets.

Geography 
Mullakayevo is located 60 km north of Baymak (the district's administrative centre) by road. Kulchurovo is the nearest rural locality.

References 

Rural localities in Baymaksky District